Bethanie Anne Nail (married name Kearney; born 24 March 1956) is a retired Australian athlete who specialised in sprint and middle distance running events.

She competed in her first international competition in 1974, at the 1974 British Commonwealth Games.  She competed in the 400 metres event.

In her first Olympic competition in Montreal, 1976, Kearney competed in the 400 metres, and the 4 × 400 metres relay events.  The relay team came fourth in the final with a time of 3 m 25.56 secs.

At the 1978 Commonwealth Games in Edmonton, she won a bronze medal in the 400 metres and a silver in the 4 × 400 metres relay.

She is currently on the Executive of the Tasmanian Olympic Council.

See also
 Australian athletics champions (Women)

References

External links
 Bethanie 'Beth' Nail at Australian Athletics Historical Results
 
 
 

1956 births
Living people
Australian female middle-distance runners
Australian female sprinters
Olympic athletes of Australia
Athletes (track and field) at the 1976 Summer Olympics
Commonwealth Games silver medallists for Australia
Commonwealth Games bronze medallists for Australia
Athletes (track and field) at the 1974 British Commonwealth Games
Athletes (track and field) at the 1978 Commonwealth Games
Commonwealth Games medallists in athletics
Olympic female sprinters
20th-century Australian women
21st-century Australian women
Medallists at the 1978 Commonwealth Games